Exeter City Women Football Club is an English women's football club, based in Exeter.

History

Elmore Eagles L.F.C.
The team was originally formed around 1997 when they were named Elmore Eagles L.F.C.

Exeter City Ladies Football Club
In 2001, the Elmore Eagles joined forces with Exeter City and the Exeter City Ladies Football Club was formed.

Exeter City Centre Of Excellence (COE) Ladies
In 2006, the club controversially changed their name to Cullompton Rangers L.F.C. Many were keen to keep the 'Exeter City Ladies' name, and in the summer of 2006, Exeter City COE Ladies was formed, entering the Devon Women's Division 2.

The team won all but 1 game in the league that season and were promoted. The team also won the League Cup. However, they were stripped of the honour after investigations were made at the beginning of the 2007/2008 and it was proven that 'illegally' signed players had played in the cup games.

Following a number of departures at the end of the 2015–16 season, Exeter City Ladies Football Club were heading towards disbandment. However, due to strong links with local schools and the Community Trust the club was kept running and continued to play in the FA Women's Premier League South West Division One.

In 2018-19 the team were crowned champions of the South West Women's Premier Division following a 3–1 victory over Keynsham Town Ladies.

Exeter City Women

At the end of the 2018–19 season the club changed their name to Exeter City Women in preparation for the campaign in the FA Women's National League Division One South West.

Players

First-team squad

Management

Current management and coaching staff 

George Hamill Goalkeeper Coach

Honours

League honours
FA South West Women's Premier Division
Champions (1): 2018-19
FA Women's Premier League South West Division One
Runners-up (1): 2014-15
South West Combination League
Runners-up (1): 2013-14
South West Women's Football League: Premier Division
Champions (2): 2001–02, 2011-12
Runners-up (1): 1999-00
South West Women's Football League: Division One West
Runners-up (1): 2010-11
Westward Developments Premier League
Promoted (1): 2009-10
Westward Developments Division One
Promoted (1): 2008-09
Westward Developments Division Two
Promoted (1): 2006-07

Cups and Trophies
Devon County Women's Senior Cup
Winners (1): 2012-13
Runners-up (2): 2010–11, 2011-12 2013-14
Devon Women's League Cup
Winners (1): 2007
Devon Cup
Winners (2): 1998, 1999
Pat Sowden Cup
Winners (2): 1998, 2002
Bristol Soccerworld Cup
Winners (1): 2010-11

References

External links 
 

Women's football clubs in England
Exeter City F.C.
Football clubs in Devon
FA Women's National League teams
Association football clubs established in 1997
1997 establishments in England